WSGL is a commercial radio station located in Naples, Florida, broadcasting on 104.7 FM.  WSGL airs a hot adult contemporary music format branded as "Mix 104.7". Although the station's format is Hot AC, WSGL reports to Mediabase as a mainstream adult contemporary station.

History
The station first received its construction permit in 1978 and signed on the air on May 10, 1980, on the 97.7 FM frequency as a country station "FM 98 WSGL". The station moved its new frequency to 103.1 in 1982, retaining the country format until 1986. The former 97.7 frequency was now at WTLQ-FM sits in the Fort Myers radio market. The station then changed its format to adult contemporary as "Class 103" in early November 1986. In September 1992, the station briefly returned back to its former country format as "Hot Country 103", but shortly returned back to adult contemporary in April 1993. In 1999, WSGL was granted a power increase to 20,000 watts and moved to its new frequency at 104.7 with the new name "Mix 104.7".

External links
Official Website

SGL
Hot adult contemporary radio stations in the United States
Renda Broadcasting radio stations
1980 establishments in Florida
Radio stations established in 1980